Paul Weber was the founder and president of the Detroit (Michigan) chapter of the Association of Catholic Trade Unionists (ACTU) from 1939 to 1947, best known for his development of an  ACTU "Industrial Council Plan" (which Weber called "economic democracy") versus a CIO Industry Council Plan to foster union-management cooperation in US Labor disputes.

Weber also belonged to the American Newspaper Guild (now NewsGuild-CWA), a CIO federation member, which made him "well-versed in union practices."

He also served as editor of Wage Earner, newspaper of the Michigan ACTU.

In 1946, Weber wrote to some Catholic leaders around the nation in defense of Walter Reuther, who he wrote "Walter Reuther is certainly not a Communist...  he is their bete noir" even if "Walter and his brothers Victor and Roy stared out to be radicals."

In 1947 during a conference of the Catholic Trl-State Congress in Grand Rapids, Michigan, Weber, "Detroit newspaperman and Association of Catholic Trade Unionists leader," joined other Catholics in opposing Communist influence on labor unions.

Works
 "ACTU," Christian Front (December, 1938)

References

External links
Websites
 The Association of Catholic Trade Unionists-Detroit papers
 Paul Weber to Father William J. Smith S.J. letter (1946.03.23)
 The Catholic Church, the Congress of Industrial Organizations, and Labor in the United States, 1930-1950
Articles
 "The Industry Council Plan as an Instrument of Reconstruction" (1944)
 "Industry Council Plan Explained by Bishop F.J. Haas" (1949)
 "The Industry Council Plan as a Form of Social Organization" (1953)
 "Trade Unions and the Industry Council Plan" / "Les Conseils industriels" (1953)
 "The Industry Council Plan as an Instrument of Reconstruction" (2006 reprint)
 Two American Concurrences in the 'Industry Council Plan'" (1954)
Books
 The Basic Principles of the Industry Council Plan of Pius XI and of the Policy of the Sherman Act (1951)
 Industrialism and the popes (1953)
 "The C.I.O. Industry Council plan : its background and implications" (1955 dissertation)

Year of birth missing
Year of death missing
Trade unionists from Michigan
American Catholics